Souad Takash (born 1 January 1994) is a Lebanese footballer who plays as a defender. She was a member of the Lebanon women's national team.

International career
Takash made her senior debut for Lebanon on 17 September 2011 in a 2–0 friendly away defeat to Jordan. She capped at the WAFF Women's Championship in 2011, where she played two games, and the 2014 AFC Women's Asian Cup qualification in 2013, where she played two games.

See also
 List of Lebanon women's international footballers

References

1994 births
Living people
Lebanese women's footballers
Women's association football defenders
Lebanon women's international footballers